Hardcore Will Never Die, but You Will is the seventh studio album by Scottish post-rock band Mogwai, released on 14 February 2011 by Rock Action Records.

In October 2011, it was awarded a silver certification from the Independent Music Companies Association (IMPALA), which indicated sales in excess of 20,000 copies throughout Europe.

The album's cover art is a photo of New York City as seen from the Hudson River. The inspiration for the closing track's title, "You're Lionel Richie", comes from what a hungover Stuart Braithwaite said when he ran into the singer at an airport.

Critical reception

Hardcore Will Never Die, but You Will received mostly positive reviews from critics. At Metacritic, which assigns a normalised rating out of 100 to reviews from mainstream critics, the album received an average score of 77, based on 34 reviews, which indicates "generally favorable reviews".

Track listing

Personnel
Credits adapted from the liner notes of Hardcore Will Never Die, but You Will.

Mogwai
 Mogwai – production
 Dominic Aitchison – bass guitar
 Stuart Braithwaite – guitar
 Martin Bulloch – drums
 Barry Burns – guitar, keyboards, vocoder 
 John Cummings – guitar

Additional personnel
 Kate Braithwaite – additional voices
 Greg Calbi – mastering
 Antony Crook – photography
 DLT – design
 Andrew Lazonby – additional voices
 Domenico Loiacano – additional voices
 Niall McMenamin – additional recording, mixing assistance
 Paul Savage – mixing, production, recording
 Kim Supajirawatananon – additional voices
 Luke Sutherland – additional guitar ; violin ; human singing

Charts

References

2011 albums
Instrumental albums
Mogwai albums
Rock Action Records albums
Sub Pop albums